Barra Airport  (also known as Barra Eoligarry Airport) is a short-runway airport (or STOLport) situated in the wide shallow bay of Traigh Mhòr at the northern tip of the island of Barra in the Outer Hebrides, Scotland. The airport is unique, believed to be the only one in the world where scheduled flights use a tidal beach as the runway. The airport is operated by Highlands and Islands Airports Limited, which owns most of the regional airports in mainland Scotland and the outlying islands. Barra Airport opened in 1936. The airport's only destination is Glasgow.

Infrastructure
The beach is set out with three runways in a triangle, marked by permanent wooden poles at their ends, in directions 07/25, 11/29, 15/33. This almost always allows the Twin Otters that serve the airport to land into the wind. At high tide these runways are under the sea; flight times vary with the tide. Emergency flights occasionally operate at night from the airport, with vehicle lights used to illuminate the runway and reflective strips laid on to the beach.

Barra Airport also has a Civil Aviation Authority Ordinary Licence (Number P792) that allows flights for the public transport of passengers or for flying instruction as authorised by the licensee (Highlands & Islands Airports Limited). The aerodrome is not licensed for night use.

Airline and destination

Statistics

Trivia
 The beach is also popular with visitors and cockle pickers, who are asked to observe the windsock to see if the airport is in operation.
 In 2011, Barra Airport was voted No.1 in the world's top airport approaches by a poll conducted by PrivateFly.com. The previous year, Barra took 10th place.

Gallery

References

External links
Barra Airport – official website
Departure from Traigh Mhor Airfield, Barra, Hebrides

Further reading
Times subject to Tides – The Story of Barra Airport, Roy Calderwood, Kea Publishing 1999  http://www.keapublishing.com

Airports in Scotland
Barra
Highlands and Islands Airports
Transport in the Outer Hebrides
Airports established in 1936
1936 establishments in Scotland